Joshua Brown, born in Leeds, is a British actor. He is best known for playing Alex Pickering in the long-running BBC school drama, Grange Hill and for the main role of Matt in the Being Human spin-off Becoming Human. He has also appeared in another long-running series, Casualty. He guest starred in an episode of Holby City as a character called Frankie Moores. Joshua has filmed episodes for series 5 of Waterloo Road.

Brown was born in Leeds and grew up in Batley. He attended the Stage 84 Performing Arts School in Bradford.

In 2013, Brown started his acting school, the Joshua Brown School of Acting.

Filmography (selection)

References

External links 
 

Living people
Male actors from Leeds
English male television actors
1990 births